Lindsay G. White (5 January 1922 – 13 March 1977) was an Australian rules footballer who represented  and  in the Victorian Football League (VFL) during the 1940s.

White was regarded as one of the best forwards of the 1940s. He was fast on the lead, was a strong overhead mark and possessed a long and accurate kick.

He kicked 67 goals in 1941, his debut season for Geelong, but at the end of the year Geelong went into temporary recess due to travel restrictions during World War II and White transferred to South Melbourne. He spent two seasons there, kicking 111 goals in 25 games and leading the league goalkicking in 1942. White returned to Geelong for the start of the 1944 season and was named club captain in 1948. In that year he again won the league goalkicking, with 86 goals.

White played until halfway through the 1950 season, retiring due to a debilitating injury to his achilles tendon.

He was playing coach of the Queanbeyan-Acton side that were premiers in the 1956 Canberra Australian National Football League season. In the grand final win over Manuka, White kicked the two goals needed to bring his season tally to 100 goals.

References

External links

1922 births
Carji Greeves Medal winners
Geelong Football Club players
Geelong Football Club captains
Sydney Swans players
Australian rules footballers from Victoria (Australia)
VFL Leading Goalkicker Medal winners
Queanbeyan Football Club players
1977 deaths